The Former Residence of Huang Xing or Huang Xing's Former Residence is where Huang Xing was born and lived from 1874 to 1893. It is located in Huangxing Town of Changsha County, Hunan.

History
The traditional folk house style residence was built by Huang Xing's ancestors during the 1st Year of Tongzhi Period of the Tongzhi Emperor (1862) in the Qing dynasty (1644–1911).

On October 25, 1874, Huang Xing was born in here.

In 1903, in order to raise money for the revolution, Huang Xing sold the house and his paddy field.

After the establishment of the Communist State, the local government seized the residence and distributed it among seven peasants.

In 1980, the Huang Xing Former Residence Memorial was founded in here.

In 1981, the local government relocated the peasants and rebuilt the residence. At the same year, it was designated as provincial level key cultural heritage.

In 1984, the Exhibition Hall of Huang Xing's Life was added.

In 1988, it was listed as a "Major Historical and Cultural Site Protected at the National Level" by the State Council of China.

Access
The Former Residence of Huang Xing open to visitors for free.

The Former Residence of Huang Xing is closed on Mondays, and is open from 9:00 to 17:00 daily.

Nearby attractions include the Former Residence of Xu Guangda and the Tomb of Zuo Zongtang.

Transportation
 Take bus No. 220 to Former Residence of Huang Xing Bus Stop.

Gallery

References

Bibliography
 

Buildings and structures in Changsha
Traditional folk houses in Hunan
1862 establishments in China
Tourist attractions in Changsha
Major National Historical and Cultural Sites in Hunan
Changsha County